Brokenstraw may refer to:

Brokenstraw Creek, a tributary of the Allegheny River
Brokenstraw Township, Warren County, Pennsylvania